Love Castle is a 2021 Nigerian film directed by Desmond Elliot, produced by United States-based Nigerian, Beatrice Funke Ogunmola and co-produced by Victor Ogunmola. The film centers on themes of tradition and family ties; it portrays Nigerian culture interwoven with disability and focuses on a deep-rooted belief about children living with disabilities, as experienced by the producers who have a child living with autism. It is a traditional story about the African culture of silence surrounding taboos.

The film stars Rachel Oniga, Zack Orji, Desmond Elliot, Kehinde Bankole, Jide Kosoko, and Adedimeji Lateef, with other Nollywood actors in the supporting roles.

The film was shot in both Ibadan, Nigeria in November 2019 and Houston, Texas, United States in February 2020. The US filming rounded up before the 2020 COVID-19 pandemic lockdown began. The language used in the film is majorly English with a minor mix of Igbo, Yoruba, and Hausa languages. The film premiered on 10 September 2021 at Terra Kulture, Lagos.

Plot 
Love Castle is a story about the Iregbogbo kingdom. The royal family had a task of getting a new king when the last king of the kingdom died. Adetutu who is the daughter of the late king is entangled with taboos after the death of her father. She left her family in Houston Texas, United States, against her wish and that of her family to become a regent in Nigeria after the death of her father.

Cast

Reception 
In 2021, the film became an official selection of Toronto International Women Festival and Toronto International Nollywood Film Festival.

The film received three awards at the Toronto International Nollywood Film Festival in Ontario, Canada on 30–31 October 2021. The film received an award for Best Film Africa, and its producer Beatrice Funke Ogunmola (BFO) received two awards: Best Nollywood Film Producer and Best Nollywood Female Filmmaker. The TINFF Committee also gave one of the actresses featured in the film, the late Rachel Oniga, an honorary award.

The film producer, Beatrice Funke Ogunmola (BFO), was nominated and won the category Festival Film Mention for Narrative for Love Castle. The award was presented by the Abuja International Film Festival (AIFF), held in Abuja, Nigeria on 4 November 2021.

In 2022, the Memorial Student Center's Dr. Carter G. Woodson Black Awareness Committee (MSC WBAC) of Texas A&M University requested to screen Love Castle.

Awards and nominations

References

External links 

2020s English-language films
2021 drama films
2021 films
English-language Nigerian films
Nigerian drama films